A total lunar eclipse took place on 15 April 2014. It was the first of two total lunar eclipses in 2014, and the first in a tetrad (four total lunar eclipses in a series). Subsequent eclipses in the tetrad are those of 8 October 2014, 4 April 2015, and 28 September 2015. Occurring 6.7 days after apogee (Apogee on 8 April 2014), the Moon's apparent diameter was smaller.

The Moon passed through the center of the Earth's shadow. This was the last central lunar eclipse of Lunar Saros 122.

The eclipse was visible in the Americas and the Pacific Ocean region, including Australia and New Zealand. This eclipse occurred during the ascending phase of the Moon's orbit, part of lunar saros 122.  Mars was near opposition.

Background 

A lunar eclipse occurs when the Moon passes within Earth's umbra (shadow). As the eclipse begins, the Earth's shadow first darkens the Moon slightly.  Then, the shadow begins to "cover" part of the Moon, turning it a dark red-brown color (typically - the color can vary based on atmospheric conditions).  The Moon appears to be reddish because of Rayleigh scattering (the same effect that causes sunsets to appear reddish) and the refraction of that light by the Earth's atmosphere into its umbra.

The following simulation shows the approximate appearance of the Moon passing through the Earth's shadow. The Moon's brightness is exaggerated within the umbral shadow. The northern portion of the Moon was closest to the center of the shadow, making it darkest, and most red in appearance.

Description 

On 15 April 2014, the Moon passed through the southern part of the Earth's umbral shadow.  It was visible over most of the Western Hemisphere, including east Australia, New Zealand, the Pacific Ocean, and the Americas.  In the western Pacific, the first half of the eclipse occurred before moonrise.  In Europe and Africa, the eclipse began just before moonset. Mars, which had just passed its opposition, appeared at magnitude -1.5 about 9.5° northwest of the Moon.  Spica was 2° to the west, while Arcturus was 32° north.  Saturn was 26° east and Antares 44° southeast.

The Moon entered Earth's penumbral shadow at 4:53:40 UTC and the umbral shadow at 5:58:19. Totality lasted for 1 hour 17.8 minutes, from 7:06:46 to 8:24:34. The moment of greatest eclipse occurred at 7:45:39. The Moon left the umbra shadow at 9:33:02 and the penumbra shadow at 10:37:33.

The peak umbral magnitude was 1.2962, at which moment the northern part of the moon was 1.7 arc-minutes south of the center of Earth's shadow, while the southern part was 40.0 arc-minutes from center.  The gamma of the eclipse was -0.3017.

The eclipse was a member of Lunar Saros 122. It was the 56th such eclipse.

Timing 

* The penumbral phase of the eclipse changes the appearance of the Moon only slightly and is generally not noticeable.

Viewing events 
Many museums and observatories planned special events for the eclipse.  The United States National Park Service sponsored events at Great Basin National Park and Sleeping Bear Dunes National Lakeshore.  The University of Hawaii's Institute for Astronomy held events at two locations on the islands.  The Griffith Observatory in Los Angeles, California streamed the eclipse live on the Internet.

NASA hosted two live question-and-answer sessions online. The first happened roughly 12 hours before the eclipse via Reddit's Ask Me Anything.  The second was a web chat hosted on NASA's site just before the eclipse began.  NASA also streamed the eclipse live on their website. NASA TV provided 3 hours of live coverage beginning at 2 a.m. EDT.

Gallery

Relation to prophecy 

Starting in 2008, Christian pastors John Hagee and Mark Biltz began teaching "blood moon prophecies": Biltz said the Second Coming of Jesus would occur at the end of the tetrad that began with the April 2014 eclipse, while Hagee said only that the tetrad is a sign of something significant. The idea gained popular media attention in the United States, and prompted a response from the scientific radio show Earth & Sky.  According to Christian Today, only a "small group of Christians" saw the eclipse as having religious significance, despite the attention.

Related eclipses

Eclipses of 2014 
 A total lunar eclipse on 15 April.
 A non-central annular solar eclipse on 29 April.
 A total lunar eclipse on 8 October.
 A partial solar eclipse on 23 October.

The 15 April 2014 eclipse was the first eclipse in a tetrad; that is, four consecutive total eclipses with no partial eclipses in between. There will be another eclipse every six lunar cycles during the tetrad – on 8 October 2014, 4 April 2015, and 28 September 2015. The lunar year series repeats after 12 cycles, or 354 days, causing a date shift when compared to the solar calendar. This shift means the Earth's shadow will move about 11 degrees west in each subsequent eclipse.

This tetrad started during the ascending node of the Moon's orbit.  It is the first tetrad since the 2003–04 series, which started in May. The next series will be from 2032 to 2033, starting in April.

Half-Saros cycle
A lunar eclipse will be preceded and followed by solar eclipses by 9 years and 5.5 days (a half saros). This lunar eclipse is related to two hybrid total/annualar solar eclipses of solar saros 129.

See also 

List of 21st-century lunar eclipses
List of lunar eclipses

References

External links 

 
 NASA LRO April 2014 Lunar Eclipse Animations
 Hermit eclipse: 2014-04-15
 April 15: Total Lunar Eclipse Sky and Telescope
 Animation of the April 14/15 2014 eclipse at shadowandsubstance.com
 Online live view of the Eclipse at virtualtelescope.eu
 APOD Spica, Mars, and Eclipsed Moon 4/16/2014

2014 in science
2014-04
April 2014 events